Sanjivani (international title: The Frontliners) is an Indian medical drama television series which aired from 12 August 2019 to 13 March 2020 on Star Plus. Produced by Alchemy Films, it starred Surbhi Chandna, Namit Khanna, Mohnish Bahl, Gurdeep Kohli and Gaurav Chopra.  Sanjivani is a rebooted version of the 2002 series of the same name.

It follows the lives of Dr. Ishani Arora and Dr. Siddhant "Sid" Mathur; complete opposites who struggle to deal with their attraction towards each other as they navigate the ups and downs of their life and career at Sanjivani Hospital.

Plot
Dr. Ishani Arora is righteous, ethical and responsible whereas Dr. Siddhant "Sid" Mathur is carefree and flirty. While Ishani believes in following rules and regulations, Sid believes in getting the job done. Unable to understand each other's ideologies, the two start off disliking each other.

As Ishani and Sid work together, a friendship sparks between them. Misunderstandings occasionally divide the two, but they sort things out. Slowly the two start having feelings for each other and confess the same.

Asha gets pregnant with Aman's child out of wedlock. Unable to handle the situation, Aman runs away. Sid fakes being married to Asha to protect her unborn child. Ishani is left heartbroken, but later learns the truth.

Asha plots to keep Sid and Ishani separated under Vardhan's instructions who wants to use Sid to get revenge on Shashank. Ishani, with help of Rahil, investigates the matter and tries to warn Sid about Asha and her intentions. Initially Sid doesn't believe her but eventually learns the truth. A furious Sid exposes Asha in front of the Sanjivani staff.

Ishani gets shot protecting Asha and her unborn child. She undergoes surgery but slips into a coma. Guilty, Asha accepts her misdeeds, backs out of Vardhan's plans and seeks forgiveness and after many days Ishani recovers.

Dr. Shashank meets with an accident and dies leaving the Sanjivani staff shattered. Sid learns about Shashank being his father. Later, Ishani and Sid expose Vardhan and get him arrested.

Ishani and Sid decide to marry. Sid is blackmailed by Ishani's relatives to stay away from her. When Sid doesn't arrive, Ishani is left shattered. Sanjivani is shut down.

3 years later
Navratan Singh buys Sanjivani, leading to its reopening. Ishani has lost the zeal to live life. Navratan motivates Ishani to give life a second chance. Ishani sees Sid in a comatose condition. She is reminded of her past and goes numb. Sid regains his consciousness but has partially lost his memory. Ishani operates on him and he recalls everything.

Sid exposes Ishani's relatives and reveals why he hadn't arrived to marry her. Ishani is left shocked. Navratan unites Ishani and Sid and this is how the show ends.

Cast

Main
 Surbhi Chandna as Dr. Ishani Mathur (née Arora) : Neurosurgeon, Siddhant's wife(2019–2020)
 Namit Khanna as Dr. Siddhant "Sid" Mathur: Neurosurgeon; Roshni and Shashank's son; Anjali's half-brother; Ishani's husband (2019–2020)
 Mohnish Bahl as Dr. Shashank Gupta: Former CEO of Sanjivani; Neurosurgeon; Anjali and Siddhant's father (2019–2020)
 Gurdeep Kohli as Dr. Juhi Singh: Neurosurgeon; Chief of Surgery (2019–2020)
 Gaurav Chopra as Navratan Singh: CEO of Sanjivani(2020)

Recurring
 Sayantani Ghosh as Dr. Anjali Gupta: HOD of Obstetrics and Gynaecology; Shashank's daughter; Siddhant's half sister. (2019–2020) Anjali was previously portrayed by Sunaina Gulia in the series Dill Mill Gayye.
 Rohit Roy as Vardhan Makhija: Chief Financial Officer (2019–2020)
 Rashmi Singh as Dr. Asha Kanwar (2019)
Chandni Bhagwanani as Dr. Asha Kanwar (2019)
 Jason Tham as Dr. Neil Lama Lau (2019–2020)
 Robin Sohi as Dr. Aman Gehlot (2019)
 Kunal Bhan as Dr. Rahil Shekhar: Siddhant's best friend (2019–2020)
 Rahul Choudhry as Dr. Rishabh Vaidya (2019–2020)
 Ekta Sohini as Roshni Mathur: Shashank's former love; Siddhant's mother (2019)
Seema Pandey as Roshni Mathur: Pandey replaced Sohni
 Sameer Khakhar as Guddu Mathur: Roshni's brother; Siddhant's uncle (2019–2020) 
 Khushbu Thakkar as Anisha Singh: Navratan's sister (2020)
 Sulakshana Khatri as Bebe: Navratan and Anisha's grandmother (2020)
 Sheela Sharma as Nurse Philo (2019–2020)

Adaptations

Production

Development
Sanjivani is a reboot of the 2002 series of the same name and follows the lives of resident doctors Ishani Arora and Sid Mathur at Sanjivani Hospital. Mohnish Bahl and Gurdeep Kohli reprise their roles of Dr. Shashank Gupta and Dr. Juhi Singh.

The plan for the reboot was announced by producer Siddharth P Malhotra in April 2019 and was confirmed in June 2019. The first look of the series was released on National Doctors' Day on 1 July 2019.

In September 2019, Mohnish Bahl's wife Ekta Sohini joined the cast as his onscreen wife Roshni Mathur. Later, she chose to quit as the track between the two was dropped off. Then, Seema Pandey was cast for the role of Roshni. In January 2020, Bahl also quit stating his inability to justify his role.

The series was supposed to wrap on 17 January 2020 due to low viewership, but received an extension of three months. A three-year leap was introduced in January 2020. Following which, Gaurav Chopra was cast as Navratan Singh.

The shooting of the series got completed on 6 March 2020.

Filming
Sanjivani was filmed in Mumbai, India. The set is a forty four floored fictional hospital named Sanjivani consisting of two wings.

Training

Reception

Critics
The Times of India said, “Sanjivani has a fresh feel, stylish look and quite a colourful touch.” Comparing the previous version, they said, "We love the fresh take and the colourful palette this season. The very feel of the hospital is very modern compared to previous season's minimalistic look of the doctors and has been made keeping in mind the latest trends."

Hindustan Times noted, “ Surbhi Chandna and Namit Khanna promise to do justice to the show's reputation in the first glimpse itself.”

The New Indian Express quoted the series as “Old ailment, new treatment.”

India Today stated, “The show has a fresh pairing of Surbhi Chandna and Namit Khanna. It's fun watching them bicker. Mohnish Behl as Dr. Shashank brings back memories from original Sanjivani and why we've loved him over the years. Actor Rohit Roy's character adds that much-needed spice in the show.”

The Quint quoted it as high on drama and style and stated, "The star-studded cast and the nostalgia factor are the driving force for this show at the outset. Surbhi and Namit's love-hate relationship will surely be the key interest point for the viewers going forward. The show feels high on style and swaps charm for impact. The writing is full of broad strokes, especially in terms of characterization."

References

External links
 
 Sanjivani on Hotstar

2019 Indian television series debuts
2020 Indian television series endings
Hindi-language television shows
Indian television soap operas
StarPlus original programming
Indian medical television series
Sequel television series